Elections were held in Illinois on Tuesday, November 6, 1984.

Primaries were held on March 20.

Election information

Turnout
Turnout in the primary election was 40.89% with a total of 2,474,610 ballots cast. 1,771,948 Democratic, 702,421 Republican, and 241 Citizens primary ballots were cast.

Turnout during the general election was 76.80%, with 4,969,330 ballots cast.

Federal elections

United States President

Illinois voted for Republican ticket of Ronald Reagan and George H. W. Bush.

This was the fifth consecutive election in which the state had voted for the Republican ticket in a presidential election.

United States Senate

Incumbent Republican Charles H. Percy, who was seeking a fifth term as senator, was unseated by Democrat Paul Simon.

United States House

All of Illinois' 22 congressional seats were up for reelection in 1984.

State elections

State Senate
Some of the seats of the Illinois Senate were up for election in 1984. Democrats retained control of the chamber.

State House of Representatives
All of the seats in the Illinois House of Representatives were up for election in 1984. Democrats retained control of the chamber.

Trustees of University of Illinois

An election was held for three of nine seats for Trustees of University of Illinois system. 

The election saw the reelection incumbent Republican Ralph Crane Hahn to a fourth term, as well as the election of new trustees Republican Susan Loving Gravenhorst and Democrat Ann E. Smith.

First-term incumbent Democrat Paul Stone lost reelection. First-term incumbent Democrat Edmund Donoghue was not nominated for reelection.

Judicial elections
Multiple judicial positions were up for election in 1984.

Ballot measure
Illinois voters voted on a single ballot measure in 1984. In order to be approved, the measure required either 60% support among those specifically voting on the amendment or 50% support among all ballots cast in the elections.

Exempt Veterans' Organizations from Property Taxes Amendment
Exempt Veterans' Organizations from Property Taxes Amendment, a legislatively referred constitutional amendment which would amend Article IX, Section 6 of the Constitution of Illinois to exempt property used exclusively by veterans' organizations from property taxes, failed to meet either threshold to amend the constitution.

Local elections
Local elections were held.

References

 
Illinois